is a Japanese footballer currently playing as a midfielder for FC Imabari.

Career statistics

Club
.

Notes

References

2002 births
Living people
People from Nishinomiya
Association football people from Hyōgo Prefecture
Japanese footballers
Association football midfielders
J3 League players
FC Imabari players